Annie Oakley is an American Western television series that fictionalizes the life of the famous Annie Oakley. (Except for depicting the protagonist as a phenomenal sharpshooter of the period, the program entirely ignores the facts of the historical Oakley's life.) Featuring actress Gail Davis in the title role, the weekly program ran from January 1954 to February 1957 in syndication. A total of 81 black-and-white episodes were produced, with each installment running 25 minutes in length. ABC aired daytime reruns of the series on Saturdays and Sundays from 1959 to 1960 and then again from 1964 to 1965.

Synopsis
The series starred Gail Davis as Annie Oakley, with Brad Johnson as Deputy Sheriff Lofty Craig and Jimmy Hawkins as Annie's little brother, Tagg Oakley; Hawkins appeared in 80 of the series' 81 episodes. In the pilot episode, "Bull's Eye", Tagg is played by Billy Gray (better known for his role as James "Bud" Anderson, Jr. on the TV version of Father Knows Best). After playing Tagg in the Annie Oakley pilot, Gray joined the cast of Father Knows Best (which premiered in October 1954, nine months after the initial broadcast of Annie Oakley).

In the series, Annie Oakley rides a horse named Target: Tagg's horse is Pixie, and Lofty's mount is Forest. Annie and Tagg live in the fictional town of Diablo, Arizona with their uncle, Sheriff Luke MacTavish, who is frequently away when trouble starts; it is then up to straight-shooting Annie and her "silent suitor", Lofty Craig, to rescue law-abiding neighbors and arrest outlaws. Tagg is often told to stay in town and out of the way. When the need arises to relay important new information or capture by outlaws, he usually ends up in the middle of each episode's adventure.

Annie always wears the same fringed cowgirl outfit, of which 15 (or more) copies were made during the show's production. She wears her hair in braided pigtails. Additional episodes were considered, but Hawkins had a growth spurt and outgrew his role as Annie's little brother. Annie Oakley was one of Gene Autry's Flying A Productions.

Guest stars
Dick Tufeld appeared fifteen times in assorted roles during the course of the series; Harry Lauter, twelve times; Stanley Andrews and Gregg Barton, eleven times each; Myron Healey, ten times; Roy Barcroft, eight times; William Fawcett, prior to his role as Pete Wilkey in Fury, seven times; William Tannen, six times, and Don C. Harvey, five times.

Richard Alexander as George Todd in "Annie and the Lacemaker" (1956)
Chris Alcaide, as Paul Dodson in "Annie and the Brass Collar", as Vic in "The Cinder Trail", and as Duke Jaegar in "Outlaw Mesa" (all 1954)
Roscoe Ates, as Curley Dawes in "Showdown at Diablo" (1956) and as Walsh in "Annie and the Miser" (1957)
Jim Bannon, as Frank Jessup in "Flint and Steel" and as Ben Porter in "Tagg Oakley, Sheriff" (both 1956).
John Beradino, professional baseball player-turned-actor, as Gorman in "Annie Rides the Navajo Trail" and as Roscoe Barnes in "Amateur Outlaw" (both 1956)
James Best, as Scott Warren in "Outlaw Mesa" and as Jess Dugan in "Annie and the Outlaw's Son" (both 1954) 
Monte Blue, as Tom Wheeler in "Flint and Steel" and as Mr. Peabody in "Tagg Oakley, Sheriff" (both 1956)
X Brands, as Randy in "Annie and the First Phone", as Tenanda in "Indian Justice", and as Peter Maher in "Annie Rings the Bell" (all 1956)
Eve Brent, under the name of Jean Lewis, played Clara Bickel, girlfriend of Banker's employee in "Sure Shot Annie" in 1955
Lane Chandler, appeared in the 1955 episode "Annie Breaks an Alibi" as a lawman
Harry Cheshire, as Windy Smith in "Annie Breaks an Alibi" and as Judge Everard Bowen in "Annie and the Higher Court" (both 1955)
Virginia Dale, appeared as Mrs Wiggins in "Flint and Steel" in 1956
John Doucette, as Hugo Barrett in "Escape from Diablo" (1954) and as Duke Bailey in "Trouble Shooter" (1955)
Lisa Gaye, appeared as the phony daughter in "Annie and the Lacemaker"
Gary Gray as Bucky Donavan in "Annie and the Six o' Spades" (1954) 
James Griffith, as George Martin in "Annie Takes a Chance" and as Mark Banning in "Powder Rock Stampede" (both 1955) 
Ron Hagerthy, as Chuck Hutchins in the title role "The Waco Kid" and as Billy Stryker in "Annie Rings the Bell" (both 1956)
I. Stanford Jolley as Walt, with Darryl Hickman as Chet Sterling, in "Annie Gets Her Man" (1954)
Alan Hale, Jr., as Eli Gorham in "Annie Calls Her Shots" and as Moose Bosco in "Annie and the Silver Ace" (both 1954)
Dick Jones, as Corporal Sam in "Annie Joins the Cavalry", as Bob Neil in "Annie Helps a Drifter", and as Steve Donavan in "Annie and the Six o'Spades" (all 1954) and as Clell Morgan in "Annie and the Junior Pioneers" (1955) 
L. Q. Jones portrayed Cal Upton in "The Robin Hood Kid" and Ned Blane in "Dilemma at Diablo" (both 1956) 
Douglas Kennedy appeared as Jim Hayward in "Annie Takes a Chance" and as Ralph Putnam in "Powder Rock Stampede" (both 1955).
Harry Lauter played Will Davis in "The Reckless Press" (1956). A saddle tramp who is jailed for suspected murder.
Nan Leslie played Alias Annie in "Alias Annie Oakley" (1954). The episode also stars Lane Bradford as Malcolm and Harry Lauter and Johnson.
Keye Luke appeared as Li Wong, a Chinese laundryman and landowner, in the 1955 episode "Annie and the Chinese Puzzle", which touches on racial discrimination.
Tyler MacDuff appeared in four episodes in 1956, including the title guest-starring role in "The Saga of Clement O'Toole" and as Don "Doc" Briggs in "Dilemma at Diablo".
Tyler McVey appeared in the 1956 episode "Showdown at Diablo" in the role of Senator Ridgeway.
Eve Miller appeared in the 1955 episode "Sure Shot Annie" in the role of Jane Lester. She appears to play a somewhat dubious Southern belle.She also appeared in the 1956 episode "The Reckless Press" as Kathy Stokes. Kathy marries a newspaper editor, but only after a tragedy and a near- tragedy.
Ewing Mitchell, as Ab Forsyth in "Annie and the Twisted Trails" and Major Paley in "Santa Claus Wears a Gun" (both 1956) and Colonel Granger in "Dude's Decision" (1957)
Fess Parker, as newspaper publisher Tom Conrad in "Annie and the Mystery Woman" and as Les Clinton in "Annie and the Texas Sandman" (both 1954)
George Pembroke, played The Welshman in "Sharpshooting Annie" in 1954
William Phipps, as George Wessel in "Sure Shot Annie (1955), as Dan Carter in "Annie and the Twisted Trails" (1956), and as Earl Wallace in "Dude's Decision (1957)
Slim Pickens, as Sundown in "Annie and the Leprechauns", as Slim in "The Waco Kid", as Ed Morgan in "Annie Rings the Bell", and as Garner in "Grubstake Bank" (all 1956)
Denver Pyle, as Dr. Barnes in "Valley of the Shadows" and as Tom Malloy in "Annie's Desert Adventure" (both 1954)
Mike Ragan, four episodes, "The Runaways" (1954), "Thunder Hill" as henchman Walt Newman (1955), "Annie Rides the Navajo Trail" as Sgt. Yorkton (1956), and "Amateur Outlaw" (1956) 
Arthur Space, as Carl Bishop in "Valley of the Shadows" and as The Warden in "Annie's Desert Adventure" (both 1954)
Glenn Strange, as  Idaho in "Outlaw Brand" and as Ernie Barker in "Treasure Map" (both 1956)
Lyle Talbot, as Pa Wiggins in "Flint and Steel" and as Colonel Dawson in "Tagg Oakley, Sheriff" (both 1956)
Lee Van Cleef appeared as Tim Brennan in "Annie Breaks an Alibi" and as Amos Belcher in "Annie and the Higher Court" (both 1955).
John War Eagle played Thunder Cloud in the 1956 episode "Indian Justice".
Pierre Watkin, as Henry Lormier in "Dean Man's Bluff" (1955) and as the Reverend Mills in "The Reckless Press" (1956)
Carleton G. Young, as the Sheriff in "Sundown Stage" (1956) and as Colonel Jackson in "The Dutch Gunmaker" (1957)

Episodes

Season 1 (1954-1955)

Season 2 (1954-1955)

Season 3 (1956-1957)

Release

Home media 
Approximately two thousand episodes lapsed into the public domain and are currently available on DVD in North America (including several releases issued through Davis's estate) and elsewhere.

On March 31, 2009, Mill Creek Entertainment released Gun Justice Featuring The Lone Ranger, with other television Westerns such as Annie Oakley.

VCI Entertainment released the complete series on DVD in Region 1 for the first time on October 21, 2014.

Media

Comics 
A number of American comics were based on the TV series: 
Annie Oakley and Tagg 4-18 (1953–1959) by Dell Comics
Annie Oakley and Tagg 1 (1965) by Gold Key Comics

Many of these issues were later reprinted in black and white by L. Miller and World Distributors Ltd.

Books 
At least three "Authorized TV Adventures" were published by Whitman Publishing Company.
Annie Oakley in Danger at Diablo, by Doris Schroeder, 1955
Annie Oakley in Double Trouble, by Doris Schroeder, 1958
Annie Oakley in Ghost Town Secret, by Doris Schroeder, 1957

References

External links
 
 
 Behind-the-scenes production photos Collection of Stephen Lodge, nephew of the script supervisor and future costumer on other TV series.

1954 American television series debuts
1957 American television series endings
1950s Western (genre) television series
Black-and-white American television shows
English-language television shows
Cultural depictions of Annie Oakley
First-run syndicated television programs in the United States
Television shows adapted into comics
Television shows set in Arizona